Aslam Hossain (born 2 February 1993) is a Bangladeshi cricketer. He made his Twenty20 debut for Prime Doleshwar Sporting Club in the 2018–19 Dhaka Premier Division Twenty20 Cricket League on 28 February 2019. He made his List A debut for Prime Doleshwar Sporting Club in the 2018–19 Dhaka Premier Division Cricket League on 21 April 2019.

References

External links
 

1993 births
Living people
Bangladeshi cricketers
Prime Doleshwar Sporting Club cricketers
Place of birth missing (living people)